On October 28, 2022, an intruder attacked Paul Pelosi, the husband of the then United States Speaker of the House, Nancy Pelosi, with a hammer during a home invasion burglary at the couple's residence in Pacific Heights, San Francisco. Pelosi was seriously injured and underwent surgery for his fractured skull.

David DePape, a 42-year-old Canadian citizen with an expired visa, was arrested at the scene. He reportedly planned to take Speaker Pelosi hostage and interrogate her. State prosecutors believe the attack to be politically motivated. DePape had a history of mental health issues and drug abuse; before the attack, he had embraced various far-right conspiracy theories, including QAnon, Pizzagate, and Donald Trump's false claims of a stolen election in 2020. Online, he made conspiratorial, racist, sexist, and antisemitic posts, and pushed COVID-19 vaccine misinformation. His blog also contained delusional thoughts.

On October 31, DePape was charged with two federal crimes: assault of an immediate family member of a federal official with the intent to retaliate against the official on account of the performance of official duties; and attempted kidnapping of a federal official on account of the performance of official duties. He was also charged with six state felonies, including attempted murder, residential burglary, and assault with a deadly weapon. Within days, prominent figures including former president Donald Trump shared disinformation and misinformation about the attack, casting doubt on the assailant's motives and claiming that the attack was a false flag operation.

Incident 

During a police interview, David DePape said that he had gained access to the Pelosi residence by breaking through glass-paneled doors at the rear of the house. Subsequent police body-worn camera footage showed the broken glass on the ground. At the time of the break-in, Paul Pelosi was sleeping in the third-floor bedroom of the home. The intruder woke Pelosi and demanded to speak to "Nancy"; when Pelosi said that she was not home, the intruder said he would wait.

Pelosi called 911 on his cellphone at 2:27 a.m. PDT but when prompted by the San Francisco Police 911 dispatcher Pelosi indicated he did not need police, fire, or medical. Pelosi later inquires about the presence of capitol police and relays that a "gentleman", David DePape, is waiting for his wife Nancy Pelosi to return. The dispatcher then advises Pelosi to "call us back if you change your mind." Pelosi continues the conversation by sharing more detail about DePape's actions and demands. The dispatcher then makes a series of inquiries to clarify the situation. At one point DePape participates in this exchange sharing his full name with the dispatcher. The call ends after Pelosi indicates DePape wants him "to get the hell off the phone" and thanks the dispatcher. The call prompted the 911 dispatcher to send police to Pelosi's aid for a wellness check, which was credited with saving his life. 

San Francisco Police Department officers quickly arrived at the Pelosi residence and knocked on the door at 2:31 a.m. Pelosi opened the door. From outside the house, police observed DePape and Pelosi struggling for a hammer at the entryway. After police ordered the two men to drop the weapon, DePape took the hammer and "violently attacked" the 82-year-old Pelosi with a single blow. Police then tackled and arrested DePape. After arresting the intruder, police discovered multiple zip ties, duct tape, white rope, a second hammer, and rubber and cloth gloves in his backpack. According to investigators, DePape had a list of additional potential targets.

Following the attack, Pelosi underwent surgery to treat a skull fracture at the Zuckerberg San Francisco General Hospital. He also received treatment for serious injuries to his hands and right arm. Pelosi was released from the hospital on November 3. DePape was treated at the same hospital for minor injuries (specifically a dislocated shoulder); upon being discharged from the hospital, he was taken to the San Francisco County Jail. 

Nancy Pelosi was in Washington, D.C. at the time of the attack. She rushed back to San Francisco on a government airplane, and a motorcade escorted her to the hospital where her husband was being treated. The following day, she wrote a "Dear Colleague" letter to members of the House of Representatives, saying that her extended family was "heartbroken and traumatized by the life-threatening attack" and thanking law enforcement, emergency services, and hospital staff for aiding her husband.

Paul Pelosi returned to public view over a month later, when he appeared with Nancy at the Kennedy Center Honors. He wore a hat and one glove to conceal his injuries.

Investigation
The Federal Bureau of Investigation, the San Francisco Police Department, the United States Capitol Police, the U.S. Attorneys, and the San Francisco District Attorney's Offices are involved in the investigation into the attack.

San Francisco District Attorney Brooke Jenkins said that the attack appeared to be politically motivated based on statements and comments made by DePape on the night of the attack.

After being Mirandized, DePape gave an interview to San Francisco Police Department officers in which he said he planned to hold Nancy hostage and that he saw her as the "leader of the pack" of lies told by the Democratic Party. He said that he considered himself to be fighting "tyranny" and likened himself to the American founding fathers. DePape told the police that he planned to kidnap and interrogate Nancy, and would break her kneecaps if she "lied" to him, believing that by doing so, "she would then have to be wheeled into Congress" as a "warning" to other members of Congress. He also told police that he was on a "suicide mission" and had additional targets in mind.

The day after the attack, investigators searched a garage in Richmond, California, where DePape had lived for the previous two years, pursuant to a federal search warrant. Investigators reported seizing "two hammers, a sword, and a pair of rubber and cloth gloves" from the property.

Before the attack, DePape was not known to the U.S. Capitol Police (USCP) and was not on any federal database tracking threats.

USCP had access to security cameras outside the Pelosi home; the cameras were installed eight years before the attack, and were among a network of approximately 1,800 cameras to which USCP has access. The footage includes the assailant breaking the glass and entering the home. However, at the time of the attack, the USCP did not monitor the external video footage in real time; such camera surveillance was only monitored when Speaker Pelosi was at home. Although Pelosi received more violent threats than any other lawmaker (and she is accompanied by a security detail when traveling), her home did not receive round-the-clock live protection.

Video of attack

On January 26, 2023, the San Francisco Superior Court made public video and audio recordings of the attack, which were shown in a preliminary court hearing. The court ordered the district attorney's office to release the materials after a coalition of news organizations, including CNN, argued for transparency in the case. DePape's lawyers argued against the release of the materials because it would "irreparably damage" his right to a fair trial. The videos include body-cam footage of officers arriving at the Pelosi's home while DePape was present. The footage shows the door opening, and DePape dressed in shorts and a blue sweatshirt, and Pelosi in underwear and a collared shirt. As officers enter, DePape and Pelosi are both holding a hammer with one hand;  DePape's other hand holding Pelosi's arm, and Pelosi's other hand holding a drinking glass. DePape is heard responding "uh, nope" to an officer's command to drop the hammer before grabbing the hammer from Pelosi's hand, lunging at him, and swinging the hammer overhead toward Pelosi's head. The files also include audio from police interviews with DePape, the 911 call Pelosi made during the attack, and home surveillance video showing DePape breaking into the back of the house with repeated hammer blows.

Accused

Canadian citizen David Wayne DePape, age 42, was arrested at the scene of the attack.

Life prior to the attack
DePape, a Canadian citizen, grew up in Powell River, British Columbia. At the time of the attack, DePape was present in the United States illegally having overstayed his six-month temporary visitor visa issued in March of 2008 when he entered at San Ysidro. 

Shortly after finishing high school in Armstrong, he had migrated to the U.S. in 2000. In Hawaii, DePape met Gypsy Taub and moved with her to California. He became estranged from his family around that time. As Taub went on to become one the most prominent faces of the 2013 San Francisco public nudity movement, DePape remained a significant associate. Scott Wiener – a city supervisor in 2013, and later a state senator – described Taub and DePape as being part of a subgroup of "extremely aggressive and creepy" public nudists though DePape never appeared nude in public on grounds of being uncomfortable.

Taub claims to have broken up with DePape in 2009; since then, his mental health had allegedly deteriorated from drug abuse and other causes. Taub described an incident from 2010 when DePape returned home after about a year of being incognito, identifying with Jesus, and exhibiting extreme paranoia. One acquaintance claimed to have had cut off contact with DePape in 2012 after he displayed megalomaniac behavior and sent her multiple emails likening himself to Jesus Christ. Nonetheless, he remained part of Taub's circle and would even be the groomsman during her wedding in 2013; he continued to live in the same house with Taub, her spouse, and her three children. They rekindled their relationship at some point but "broke up" for good in 2015 with DePape shifting out and being homeless for a while; however, they remained intermittently in contact until Taub's incarceration.

As of the attack, he had been a resident of Richmond, California, for three years, living in a rented garage next to a home. In the six years prior to his arrest, he worked as a helper for a patio deck builder.

Social media activity  

In 2007, DePape started a personal blog, initially writing about topics such as spirituality and ibogaine. During the months that preceded the attack, DePape resumed writing on his blog after a long hiatus, this time on conspiracy theories and alt-right politics. In multiple posts on social media platforms and at least two blogs, DePape espoused far-right views, promoting QAnon, Pizzagate, and other far-right conspiracy theories, as well as sharing far-right Internet memes.

In 2021, DePape had posted videos by My Pillow CEO Mike Lindell that falsely claimed the 2020 U.S. presidential election to have been stolen; across 2022, he linked to COVID-19 vaccine misinformation videosclaiming that the vaccines were deadly and that data was covered upand alleged that George Floyd had died of a drug overdose rather than being murdered by former officer Derek Chauvin. He credited Gamergate for making him shift in 2014 to right-wing politics. He also expressed a fascination for conservative authors Jordan Peterson and James A. Lindsay. One month before the attack, a website written under DePape's name declared that any journalist who challenged Trump's election fraud claims "should be dragged straight out into the street and shot". DePape also attacked Jews, immigrants, people of color, women, LGBTQ people, social justice warriors, Catholics, and Muslims. He promoted a range of antisemitic conspiracy theories, including proclaiming the innocence of Adolf Hitler, denying the Holocaust, and accusing Jews of orchestrating the 2022 Russian invasion of Ukraine. His online posts were also often delusional, once attacking Jesus as "the antichrist" and included references to communication with invisible fairies and the occult. His last post, published a day before the attack, was titled "Why Colleges are becoming Cults".

Party affiliation records note DePape to be a Green Party member as of 2014; according to Taub, he was "more on the far left than the far right" during their relationship. Experts on extremism and terrorism say that such shifts in viewsfrom left-wing fringe movements to the far-rightcan be held as "side switching", a fairly common phenomenon among persons who are radicalized online, who shift between "mutually exclusive or hostile ideologies" through "bridging areas" such as antisemitism, anti-government stance, and misogynist beliefs.

State and federal prosecution
On October 31, federal prosecutors charged DePape with "attempted kidnapping of a federal official in the performance of official duties" and "assaulting an immediate member of a federal official's family and inflicting a serious injury with a dangerous weapon", and on November 9, a federal grand jury indicted him on the same two charges. On November 3, Immigration and Customs Enforcement lodged an immigration detainer on DePape, intending on taking custody of DePape after he is released from custody and make it possible to deport him.

On October 31, the San Francisco District Attorney's Office filed state charges against DePape, including six felonies: attempted murder, residential burglary, elder abuse, assault with a deadly weapon, false imprisonment of an elder, and threatening the family member of public official. At his arraignment in San Francisco Superior Court on November 1, DePape pleaded not guilty to the state charges. If convicted of all state charges, DePape faces a sentence of between 13 years and life imprisonment. On November 4, he was denied bail. A preliminary hearing was heard December 14.

Reactions
President Joe Biden expressed support for the Pelosi family and said there was too much political violence, hatred, and vitriol. Biden compared the attack on Paul Pelosi with the January 6 Capitol attack and said Republicans talking about "stolen elections" and "COVID being a hoax" may "affect people who may not be so well balanced." Vice President Kamala Harris blamed the current political climate for inspiring the attack. California Governor Gavin Newsom said the "heinous attack" on Pelosi was "yet another example of the dangerous consequences of the divisive and hateful rhetoric that is putting lives at risk and undermining our very democracy." San Francisco Mayor London Breed called the attack a "horrific and scary incident", offering her support to Pelosi's family and thanking the first responders. The attack and broader concerns of violence and threats prompted calls from members of Congress to increase security.

The attack on Pelosi was condemned by Senate Majority Leader Chuck Schumer (who called it "a dastardly act"); Senate Minority Leader Mitch McConnell (who said that the assault "horrified and disgusted" him); by House Minority Whip Steve Scalise (who was seriously wounded in the 2017 congressional baseball shooting, and who called the attack on Pelosi "horrific"); House Minority Leader Kevin McCarthy, and Senate Minority Whip John Thune.

Republican officials sent mixed messages on the attack, prompting criticism from Democrats. Many Republicans denounced the attack, though others spread conspiracy theories about it. Some Republicans who condemned the attack issued statements criticizing "both sides" for violent rhetoric and political violence. Few Republicans spoke out against colleagues who spread conspiracy theories before the attack on Pelosi, or who promoted conspiracy theories about the attack itself. Top Republican officials, such as Republican National Committee Chair Ronna McDaniel and National Republican Congressional Committee Chair Tom Emmer, rejected assertions that inflammatory Republican rhetoric, including vilification of Nancy Pelosi, contributed to an atmosphere that risked violence. A week before the attack, Emmer posted a video of himself firing a gun with the hashtag #FirePelosi; after the attack, he deflected a question asking if he should have used a gun in the ad. Some Republicans made jokes about the attack. Glenn Youngkin, the Republican governor of Virginia, said "There's no room for violence anywhere, but we're gonna send Nancy Pelosi back to be with him in California", a remark that attracted controversy.

Speaker Pelosi later commented that the Republicans' performance in the 2022 midterms elections, widely described as a disappointment for the GOP, was partly due to what she described as their "horrible response" to the attack.

Misinformation and disinformation  

Prominent right-wing figures shared misinformation and disinformation about the attack. Within days of the attack, such claims had spread among the Republican mainstream. The New York Times noted that the claims "appeared intended to deflect attention from Mr. DePape's views." Right-wing figures who spread misinformation about the attack included Roger Stone, Dinesh D'Souza, and Steve Bannon, all of whom implied that the attack could be a "false flag". Some of the lies that circulated about the attack on Pelosi were based on homophobia.

Elon Musk shared a tweet with an article from a right-wing fake news website, falsely suggesting that the attack resulted from a drunken Paul Pelosi having a fight with a male prostitute. Musk deleted his tweet hours later after it had amassed 24,000 retweets and 86,000 likes.

Republican congressman Clay Higgins (R-LA), Republican congresswomen Marjorie Taylor Greene (R-GA) and Claudia Tenney (R-NY), Donald Trump Jr., and former Milwaukee County Sheriff David Clarke Jr. all disseminated other false claims about the attack, such as claims that Pelosi knew the attacker or was involved in male prostitution. Referring to various conspiracies, conservative talk radio host Charlie Kirk called for an "amazing patriot" from among his audience to "be a midterm hero" by deciding to "bail out" DePape "and then go ask him some questions". Days after the attack, former president Donald Trump also spread false conspiracy theories about the attack, suggesting it could have been staged. Some right-wing pundits depicted the attack on Pelosi as a random crime, blaming Democrats for it, rather than a targeted assault. Some spreaders of misinformation seized on early inaccurate reporting by some news outlets in the immediate aftermath of the attack; despite the outlets providing corrections, these reports fueled baseless conspiracy theories that went viral online and in right-wing circles. Donald Trump Jr responded to a tweet making fun of Pelosi about a Halloween “costume” of just a hammer and a pair of tight white briefs.

Philip Bump, a columnist for The Washington Post, wrote that misinformed narratives about the event either focused on "what Democrats are doing wrong, instead of having to talk about where right-wing rhetoric is problematic" or portrayed "Democratic leaders not as actual targets of violence but, instead, as the real wrongdoers." In this case, these narratives gained popularity among right-wing users on social media, wrote Bump, because in that sphere there was "an audience for extreme conspiracy theories"; "an infrastructure for vetting and promoting them"; and "very little interest in self-correcting".

Notes

References

Further reading  

 
 

2020s crimes in California
2022 in San Francisco
Attacks in the United States in 2022
Crimes in San Francisco
Hammer assaults
Nancy Pelosi
October 2022 crimes in the United States
Political violence in the United States
QAnon